Barbara Bishop (born 10 February 1956) is a Barbadian sprinter. She competed in the women's 400 metres at the 1972 Summer Olympics.

References

1956 births
Living people
Athletes (track and field) at the 1972 Summer Olympics
Barbadian female sprinters
Olympic athletes of Barbados
Place of birth missing (living people)
Olympic female sprinters